Robert DeWayne Papenbrook (September 18, 1955 – March 17, 2006) was an American voice actor.

Career
Fellow voice actors often nicknamed him "Pappy". He was very well known in the worlds of anime and video game voice-overs for his voice acting of "gruff" characters. However, he was especially well known in his various live action voice-overs which, most notably, included the Power Rangers franchise. He was discovered by filmmakers Steven Spielberg and George Lucas, which got him his very first voice acting role in the hit film Raiders of the Lost Ark (1981) as the voices of all the Hovito natives who pursue Indiana Jones in the beginning of the film. His best-known roles included the voices of Rito Revolto in Mighty Morphin Power Rangers and Power Rangers Zeo, Shadowborg in Big Bad Beetleborgs, Scorpix in Beetleborgs Metallix and Deviot in Power Rangers: Lost Galaxy.

Personal life
Aside from acting, he also taught kickboxing and other martial arts. He and his wife Debbie Rothstein married in 1978 and had a son, Bryce Papenbrook, who is also a voice actor.

Death
On March 17, 2006, Papenbrook died of chronic lung problems at the age of 50. The 2008 DVD Adventures in Voice Acting was dedicated to him (whose appearance was filmed before his death).

Filmography

Anime
 .hack//Sign – Lios
 Bobobo-bo Bo-bobo – Kilalino
 The Big O – Roscoe Fitzgerald
 Brigadoon: Marin & Melan – Animal Keeper, President, Principal, Tadashi Tokita
 Cyborg 009 (2001) – Cop, Blue Beast, Dr. Eckerman, Scientist
 Daigunder – Bulion
 Digimon: Digital Monsters – Daemon (Adventure 02), Tadashi Katou (Tamers), Majiramon (Tamers), Kongoumon (Frontier), ShogunGekomon (Adventure and Adventure 02), Additional Voices
 Dinozaurs – Gigano Dragon
 Duel Masters – Prince Herbert the Ruthless, Prince Eugene the Mean
 Eureka Seven – Ken-Goh (Episode 1-28)
 Fafner in the Azure – Kyousuke Mizoguchi
 Flint the Time Detective – Rocky Hammerhead, Blademan of the Cardians
 Giant Robo: The Animation (as Robert D. Papenbrook) – Juujoji the Bell of Life
 Great Teacher Onizuka (as John Smallberries) – Hiroshi Uchiyamada
 Heat Guy J – J
 Kikaider 01 – Shadow Knight
 Last Exile – David Mad-thane
 Magic Knight Rayearth – Lafarga
 Maetel Legend – Conductor
 Macross Plus – Raymond Marley
 Mezzo Forte (as John Smallberries) – Momokichi Momoi
 Phantom Quest Corp. – Rokkon
 Rave Master – Bis Ras
 Rurouni Kenshin – Koshijirou Kamiya, Heizo Ogawa, Hyottoko, Muraki Uramura
 Scrapped Princess – Berkens
 Sentō Yōsei Yukikaze – Major General Linneberg
 Shinzo – Kutal/Hyper Kutal
 Street Fighter II V – Warden Nuchi
 Super Pig – Fowley Fastback
 Tenchi Muyo! Ryo-Ohki OVA 3 – Katsuhito Masaki/Yosho, Nobuyuki Masaki
 Tenchi in Tokyo –  Nobuyuki Masaki, Katsuhito Masaki, Dokuzen Tsuchida, and Jurai Priest.
 Tenchi Muyo! GXP (as John Smallberries) – NB, Katsuhito Masaki/Yosho
 Transformers: Robots in Disguise – Mega-Octane/Ruination
 Wolf's Rain – Retrieval Squad Commander

Live-action
 Big Bad Beetleborgs – Amphead, Shadowborg, Hammerhands (voices), Borgslayer (shared voice role with Dave Mallow)
 Beetleborgs Metallix – Aqualungs, Scorpix, Boron (voices)
 Cold Case – Wade Ribble (Episode Discretion/deceased suspect character)
 Greed: The Series – Himself
 Masked Rider – Edentada, Cyborgator, Bruticon (voices)
 Mighty Morphin Power Rangers – Rito Revolto, Showbiz Monster, Saliguana, Snizard (voices – all minus Rito uncredited)
 Power Rangers: Zeo – Rito Revolto, Silo (1st voice), Punch-A-Bunch, Borax the Varox (voices, all minus Rito uncredited)
 Power Rangers: Turbo – Amphibidor, Torch Tiger (voices, uncredited)
 Power Rangers: In Space – Sting King, Lunatick, Spikey (voices, uncredited)
 Power Rangers: Lost Galaxy – Radster, Deviot (voices – Radster uncredited) 
 Power Rangers: Lightspeed Rescue – Fireor, Thunderclaw (voices)
 Power Rangers: Time Force – Univolt, Artillicon (voices)
 Power Rangers: Wild Force – Bell Org (voice), Mike (sporting goods store clerk; only on-screen role in Power Rangers franchise)
 VR Troopers – Spitbot, Footbot, Vanbot, Serpentoid (voices)

Film
 Ah! My Goddess: The Movie (2001) – Toraichi Tamiya (voice)
 Dawn of the Dead – Additional Voices
 Digimon: The Movie – Red Greymon (voice)
 The Happy Cricket (English version) – Wartlord (voice)
 Jeepers Creepers 2 – Guy in Station Wagon
 Lupin III: The Mystery of Mamo (1994) – Flinch (voice)
 Mobile Suit Gundam F91 – Cosmo Eigesse, Additional Voices (as John Smallberries)
 Patlabor: The Movie – Fukushima (voice)
 Raiders of the Lost Ark – Voice of screaming natives chasing Indiana Jones (debut role)
 Scooby-Doo 2: Monsters Unleashed (2004) – Black Knight Ghost (voice)
 Sky Blue (2004) – Goliath, Governor, Typon (voice)
 Stranger than Fiction – Animal Attack V.O. #3 (voice)
 Street Fighter Alpha: The Animation (2001) – Dan Hibiki (voice) 
 Tenchi Muyo in Love 2 – Haruka Naru Omoi aka Tenchi Forever: Nobuyuki Masaki, Katsuhito Masaki
 Tenchi the Movie 2: The Daughter of Darkness''' – Nobuyuki Masaki, Katsuhito Masaki (voices)
 Tugger the 4x4 Jeep – BD (voice)
 The Toy Warrior (2005) – Mr. Liverstone (voice)
 Zentrix – Dr. Roark (voice)
 Hoodwinked! – Vincent (voice – uncredited)

Documentaries
 Adventures in Voice Acting – Himself

Video games
 .hack//Mutation – Lios
 .hack//Outbreak – Lios
 .hack//Quarantine – Lios
 The Bard's Tale – Additional Voices
 Dungeons & Dragons: Dragonshard EverQuest II: Desert of Flames EverQuest II: Kingdom of Sky Resident Evil Outbreak & Resident Evil Outbreak: File #2 – David King
 Ghost Recon Advanced Warfighter 
 Splinter Cell: Double Agent – Gas Chamber Guard (posthumous release; last performance)
 Gundam Side Story 0079: Rise From the Ashes – Additional Voices
 Seven Samurai 20XX – Drei
 The Suffering: Ties That Bind – Copperfield
 Vampire Hunter D – Borgoff, Machira
 Warcraft III: Reign of Chaos''

References

External links
 	
	
Bob Papenbrook at CrystalAcids Anime Voice Actor Database

1955 births
2006 deaths
20th-century American male actors
21st-century American male actors
American male television actors
American male voice actors
Contestants on American game shows
Deaths from lung disease
Male actors from San Diego